Sniper is a 1993 American action film directed by Luis Llosa. The film stars Tom Berenger and Billy Zane as snipers on an assassination mission in Panama. It is the first installment in the Sniper film series, and was followed by eight direct-to-video sequels: Sniper 2, Sniper 3, Sniper: Reloaded, Sniper: Legacy, Sniper: Ghost Shooter, Sniper: Ultimate Kill, Sniper: Assassin's End and Sniper: Rogue Mission. It was shot in Queensland, Australia, and debuted at number two in the United States.

Plot 
Master Gunnery Sergeant Thomas Beckett, Force Reconnaissance Marine, an experienced sniper, and his spotter, Cpl. Papich, are on a mission to assassinate a Panamanian rebel leader in the jungle.  Upon successful completion of their mission, Beckett and Papich covertly withdraw from the area to await extraction.  Because they are erroneously extracted in daylight instead of at night, Papich is killed by a sniper (armed with an SVD Dragunov). Beckett runs back under fire to carry Papich's remains to the helicopter.

Later, Beckett is paired with an inexperienced civilian, Richard Miller to eliminate rebel General Miguel Alvarez funded by the Colombian drug lord, Raoul Ochoa. Miller is an Olympic medalist and SWAT team sharpshooter, but he has no combat experience, no jungle operations experience, and no confirmed kills to his name. Miller is also ordered by his superiors to kill Beckett if Beckett either threatens or compromises the covert operation to eliminate both Alvarez and Ochoa. While proceeding to the staging area, Miller's UH-1 helicopter is fired upon by a guerrilla armed with an AK-47 Rifle.  Several of the helicopter's crew and passengers are killed. With his Heckler & Koch SR9TC rifle fixed on the attacker, Miller is decidedly unable to shoot him; instead, the helicopter's fatally-wounded door-gunner makes the kill, but the aircraft's surviving aviator believes Miller made the crucial shot, earning Miller a false reputation.

On the mission, Beckett insists on deviating from the plan that Miller was given.  This, together with the fact that Miller has no professional experience or aptitude for jungle operations, sparks friction between the two. Early on, they encounter a group of Indians, who agree to lead them past the rebel guerrillas, in return for a favor: they must agree to eliminate El Cirujano ("The Surgeon"), an ex-CIA agent and expert in torture who has been aiding the rebels.  Beckett agrees to do so.

Uncertain of Miller's reliability and skeptical about his "kill" while recently aboard the UH-1 helicopter, he tells Miller to kill El Cirujano in order to prove himself. However, when the time comes, Miller fails again by first firing a "warning shot," followed by a shot at Cirujano's head.  Cirujano is able to dodge the head shot by ducking under it into the river in which he has been swimming. In the ensuing firefight with the alarmed guerrillas, one of the Indians is killed.  Although the Indians do not directly blame either Beckett or Miller, they withdraw further help.

En route to the target, they realize they are being followed by another sniper. They head to a village to contact their informant, a priest, only to find that he has been tortured and murdered by Alvarez's men well before they arrived. Beckett speculates out loud that it is the work of El Cirujano, calling into question Miller's credibility. That night, Beckett marks their track with a small piece of trash to bait the follower – the sniper that killed Papich – into a trap and uses Miller as bait to pull the sniper out of hiding to take him out.

The two men finally reach the General's hacienda. While waiting for their targets to emerge, they find Cirujano to be alive after all. Miller isn't hidden very well, and is spotted by one of the guards trying to sneak up on Miller. Beckett kills Miller's attacker while Miller takes out the drug lord. Being forced to save Miller's life instead of killing the General, Beckett insists on going back to take out the General. Miller's refusal to complete the mission leads to an exchange of fire between Beckett and Miller. Miller ceases after running out of ammunition and suffers a mental-emotional breakdown complete with hallucinations.

As rebels close in on the two, Beckett attempts to provide cover fire for Miller. Seeing himself outnumbered, he surrenders to the rebels and, knowing Miller is watching, stealthily ejects a round from the chamber of his rifle while holding it up, then drops the bullet on the ground; Miller picks it up after Beckett is taken away.

With nighttime approaching, Miller goes to the extraction site, but instead of boarding the UH-1 helicopter, he heads to the base camp, where he kills the general with his knife.  He finds Beckett being tortured by El Cirujano, who has cut off the trigger finger of Beckett's right hand. Beckett spots Miller in the distance and uses a ploy to both distract Cirujano and mouth Miller instruction to kill both of them with one shot. Instead, Miller sticks to "one shot, one kill" and shoots Cirujano in the head. The two run to the UH-1 helicopter for extraction, and Beckett once again saves Miller's life: using his left hand, he uses Cirujano's confiscated pistol to shoot an ambushing sniper. The final scene shows Beckett and Miller on the way back home aboard the UH-1.

Cast

 Tom Berenger as Master Gunnery Sergeant Tom Beckett
 Billy Zane as NSC Agent Richard Miller
 J. T. Walsh as Colonel Chester Van Damme
 Aden Young as Corporal Doug Papich
 Ken Radley as "El Cirujano", Ex-CIA agent whose nickname in Spanish means the surgeon. 
 Reynaldo Arenas as Cacique, Indian native chief of Panama.
 Don Battee as T.J., Soldier on U.S. base in Panama.
 Loury Cortez as Father Ruiz, passes along intelligence to Beckett.
 Gary Swanson as NSC Officer in Washington 
 Hank Garrett as Admiral in Washington 
 Rex Linn as Colonel Weymuth (uncredited)
 Frederick Miragliotta as General Miguel Alvarez
 Vanessa Steele as Mrs. Alvarez
 Carlos Alvarez as Raul Ochoa
 Roy Edmunds as Captain Cabrera, Rebel Captain killed in the opening scene.
 Edward Wiley as Desilva, Rebel sniper trained by Beckett.

Production

Casting
Billy Zane was cast after his starring role in Dead Calm raised his profile.  Director Luis Llosa, who grew up watching American films, called modern films "cartoonish and antiseptic" in their depiction of violence; he said that he wanted to bring back a sense of impact to killing.

Filming
It was shot in Queensland, Australia.

Release

Home media 
Columbia TriStar Home Video released it on VHS in August 1993, LaserDisc in September 1993, and on DVD in October 1998.

Reception

Box office 
Sniper was held back from release in 1992. It debuted at number two at the box office on January 29, 1993, in 1551 theaters and went on to gross $18,994,653 in the US.

Critical response
Rotten Tomatoes, a review aggregator, reports that 38% of twelve surveyed critics gave the film a positive review; the average rating was 4.7/10.  Roger Ebert rated it 3/4 stars and wrote, "Sniper expresses a cool competence that is a pleasure to watch. It isn't a particularly original film, but what it does, it does well."  Variety called it "an expertly directed, yet ultimately unsatisfying psychological thriller" that is "undermined by underdeveloped characters and pedestrian dialogue."  Vincent Canby of The New York Times described it as "partly a badly choreographed action drama and partly a psychological exploration of Beckett's mind, which comes up empty."

Michael Wilmington of the Los Angeles Times called it a shallow film that does not explore the themes suggested by the script and instead turns into a bloodless, macho video game. Clifford Terry of the Chicago Tribune called it a formulaic male-bonding drama that features a Hollywood odd-coupling.  Richard Harrington of The Washington Post criticized the lack of character progression and the implausible conclusion.

Stephen Wigler of The Baltimore Sun called it a "poorly written, badly directed film" that substitutes violence for sex.  Marjorie Baumgarten of the Austin Chronicle rated it 3.5/5 stars and wrote, "Sniper does little that's terribly original but that which it does, it does with great competence and grace."

Sequels

Sniper spawned eight sequels: Sniper 2 in 2002, Sniper 3 in 2004, Sniper: Reloaded in 2011, Sniper: Legacy in 2014, Sniper: Ghost Shooter in 2016, Sniper: Ultimate Kill in 2017, Sniper: Assassin's End in 2020 and Sniper: Rogue Mission in 2022. Sniper: Reloaded, Sniper: Ghost Shooter and Sniper: Ultimate Kill features Billy Zane's role of Richard Miller from the first Sniper film reprised, having himself become a sniper following his Panamanian tour experience with Thomas Beckett.

References

External links 
 
 
 
 

1993 films
1990s action films
American action films
Films set in Panama
Films shot in Queensland
Films about snipers
Films about the United States Marine Corps
Films directed by Luis Llosa
Films scored by Gary Chang
TriStar Pictures films
Sniper (film series)
1990s English-language films
1990s American films